Jamie Lim (born February 23, 1959 in Timmins, Ontario) was Mayor of Timmins from 2000 to 2003. She was educated at the University of Western Ontario; she holds a Bachelor of Arts and Bachelor of Education degree. Lim was an elected school board trustee and city councillor (1997) for Timmins City Council before being elected mayor in 2000, succeeding veteran mayor Victor M. Power on his retirement. She was Timmins' first female mayor. During her tenure as mayor, she was elected third vice-president of the Federation of Canadian Municipalities.

In the municipal election of 2003, Power returned to politics and defeated Lim. Lim's re-election campaign discussed economic development, youth, and the revitalization of the community, but she faced criticism for her support for the construction of a new public library building when critics charged that other projects, notably a larger police facility, should have been prioritized. Those same critics now herald her decision to build the library considering it is a hub of the community wherein citizens of the city can access high speed internet, find up-to-date resources necessary to further their own mean, and take pride in one of the most beautiful buildings ever constructed in the City of Timmins. It was built and decorated in a fashion to honour the Indigenous heritage of the community acknowledging that Timmins is within the Treaty 9 area of the province.

She is now retired from the position of President and CEO of the Ontario Forest Industries Association where she served for more than 17 years, leading the organization through some very difficult challenges. Where Timmins may have lost out on a very astute, forward-thinking leader, the OFIA benefitted greatly from Ms. Lim's transformational leadership. From former Mayor to CEO, Jamie has a track record of effecting positive change in senior roles spanning several sectors, including: municipal government, healthcare, education and forestry. She is a builder and a visionary who has demonstrated successfully and repetitively the ability to navigate in complex environments, create and implement strategy, drive change, foster trust and credibility, and engage diverse stakeholders. She always demonstrates a willingness to “roll up the sleeves” to accomplish objectives. Jamie took great pleasure in representing a sector whose roots, like hers, run deep in Northern Ontario. Jamie currently resides in both Timmins and Toronto, and her three children have all succeeded to positions in the medical field.

References

Living people
1959 births
Businesspeople from Ontario
Women mayors of places in Ontario
Mayors of Timmins
Timmins city councillors
Canadian women in business
Canadian chief executives